Dai Bevan (birth unknown – death unknown) was a Welsh professional rugby league footballer who played in the 1900s. He played at representative level for Welsh League XIII, as a forward (prior to the specialist positions of), during the era of contested scrums.

International honours
Dai Bevan played as a forward, i.e. number 11, for Welsh League XIII in the 14-13 victory over Australia at Penydarren Park, Merthyr Tydfil on Tuesday 19 January 1909.

References

External links

Place of birth missing
Place of death missing
Rugby league forwards
Welsh League rugby league team players
Welsh rugby league players
Year of birth missing
Year of death missing